The 1954–55 season was Stoke City's 48th season in the Football League and the 15th in the Second Division.

Taylor continued to add new players to the squad as the aim for 1954–55 was to gain promotion back to the First Division. Stoke made a great start to the season winning five out of their first six matches. Taylor was able to field a settled team for the majority of the season alas Stoke could not keep up their form and promotion was missed with Stoke finishing in 5th position. In the FA Cup Stoke were involved in one of the longest cup ties as their third round encounter with Bury went on to a fourth replay with Stoke finally winning 3–2 after 9 hours and 22 minutes of football.

Season review

League
Stoke manager Frank Taylor continued to purchase players as he attempted to guide Stoke back into the First Division. He added the Wolverhampton Wanderers left back Jack Short to his squad in the summer of 1954. Things looked to be improving when Stoke started the 1954–55 season in fine form winning five out of six. Taylor was fortunate to be able to field a settled side but the form rate was not maintained and promotion was missed, albeit by a narrow margin, Stoke taking fifth spot just two behind promoted Birmingham City and Luton Town. During the season Stoke beat Liverpool away 4–2 their first victory at Anfield for 60 years.

FA Cup
In the FA Cup Stoke were drawn with Bury in the third round and after four draws the tie went to a fourth replay with Stoke finally beating Bury 3–2 in extra time. In total the tie took 9 hours and 22 minutes of football and had an aggregated scoreline of 10–9.    Unfortunately for Stoke it was all in vain as in the next round they were defeated by Swansea Town.

Final league table

Results

Stoke's score comes first

Legend

Football League Second Division

FA Cup

Squad statistics

References

Stoke City F.C. seasons
Stoke